Michael Wentzel (born April 10, 2002) is a German professional footballer who plays as a defender for St. Louis City SC 2 in MLS Next Pro.

Early years

College career

Club career

RW Oberhausen 
On August 26, 2022, Michael sign for RW Oberhausen from Borussia Mönchengladbach.

St. Louis City 2 
On 25 January 2023, Michael signed for St. Louis City SC 2 from RW Oberhausen.

Career statistics

Club

Honours

References

External links 

2002 births
Living people